E. polymorpha may refer to:

 Elkinsia polymorpha, a seed fern
 Emmonsia polymorpha, a tabulate coral
 Eudistylia polymorpha, a polychaete worm